Leandro Marcolini Pedroso de Almeida (born 19 March 1982), generally known as Leandro, is a professional footballer. He plays as a midfielder. Born in Brazil, he played for the Hungary national team.

Club career
He has also played for Brazilian clubs Londrina, Corinthians, Atlético Paranaense, and Hungarian clubs Debreceni VSC, Ferencváros, MTK, Haladás and Bük.

AC Omonia
In January 2010 he signed a contract with Cypriot side AC Omonia. He broke into the first team very quickly and he soon became a key player. He also won the Championship with Omonoia. He scored at the Super Cup match to send the match to penalties and win another title with Omonia. At the end of the season Omonia won the Cup too with Leandro the hero for Omonia scoring at the extra time at semi-finals. For the 2011–2012 season he is named 3rd captain of Omonia for what he offered to the club, behind Constantinos Makrides and Christos Karipidis. During the 2011–2012 season, the Brazilian faced many injury problems and played poorly, resulting the raise of the issue of disengagement because of his injuries. Eventually, he stayed and participated in the preparation with no problems, and not only he won a position in the starting lineup but became captain of the team. Leandro became the leader of Omonia, and an example of consistency and professionalism.

Ferencváros
On 16 June 2020, he became champion with Ferencváros by beating Budapest Honvéd FC at the Hidegkuti Nándor Stadion on the 30th match day of the 2019–20 Nemzeti Bajnokság I season.

Career statistics
.

International career
After residing in Hungary for 5 years since the age of 17, he became a naturalized citizen of Hungary. He has since played for Hungary. Leandro's début came on 1 June 2004, in a match against China.

Statistics

Honours
 MTK Hungária FC
Hungarian Cup: 1999/00
 Ferencvárosi TC
Hungarian League: 2003/04
Hungarian Cup: 2002/03, 2003/04, 2015/16, 2016/17
 Debreceni VSC
Hungarian League: 2006/07, 2008/09
Hungarian Cup: 2007/08
Hungarian Super Cup: 2007, 2009
 Atlético Paranaense
Campeonato Paranaense: 2005
 AC Omonia
Cypriot Championship: 2009–10
Cypriot Cup: 2011, 2012
Cyprus FA Shield: 2010, 2012

External links
Brazilian FA archive 

HLSZ 

1982 births
Living people
Brazilian footballers
Hungarian footballers
Hungary international footballers
Hungary under-21 international footballers
Association football fullbacks
MTK Budapest FC players
Ferencvárosi TC footballers
Debreceni VSC players
Szombathelyi Haladás footballers
Büki TK Bükfürdő footballers
Club Athletico Paranaense players
AC Omonia players
Nemzeti Bajnokság I players
Cypriot First Division players
Hungarian expatriate footballers
Expatriate footballers in Cyprus
Hungarian expatriate sportspeople in Cyprus
Hungarian people of Brazilian descent
People from Cornélio Procópio
Naturalized citizens of Hungary
Brazilian emigrants to Hungary
Sportspeople from Paraná (state)
Brazilian expatriate sportspeople in Hungary
Brazilian expatriate sportspeople in Cyprus
Brazilian expatriate footballers
Naturalised association football players